In jazz, the altered scale, altered dominant scale, Palamidian Scale, or Super Locrian scale is a seven-note scale that is a dominant scale where all non-essential tones have been altered. This means that it comprises the three irreducibly essential tones that define a dominant seventh chord, which are root, major third, and minor seventh and that all other chord tones have been altered. These are:
 the fifth is altered to a 5 and a 5
 the ninth is altered to a 9 and a 9
the eleventh is altered to a 11 (equivalent to a 5)
the thirteenth is altered to a 13 (equivalent to a 5)

The altered forms of some of the non-essential tones coincide (augmented eleventh with diminished fifth and augmented fifth with minor thirteenth) meaning those scale degrees are enharmonically identical and have multiple potential spellings. The natural forms of the non-essential tones are not present in the scale. This means it lacks a major ninth, a perfect eleventh, a perfect fifth, and a major thirteenth. 

This is written below in musical notation with the essential chord tones coloured black and the non-essential altered chord tones coloured red.

The altered scale is made by the sequence: 

Half, Whole, Half, Whole, Whole, Whole, Whole 

The abbreviation "alt" (for "altered") used in chord symbols enhances readability by reducing the number of characters otherwise needed to define the chord and avoids the confusion of multiple equivalent complex names. For example, "C7alt" supplants "C759911", "C7−5+5−9+9", "Caug7−9+9+11", etc.

This scale has existed for a long time as the 7th mode of the ascending melodic minor scale.

Enharmonic spellings and alternate names

The C altered scale is also enharmonically equivalent to the C Locrian mode with F changed to F. For this reason, the altered scale is sometimes called the super-Locrian scale or the Locrian flat four scale.

It is also enharmonically the seventh mode of the ascending melodic minor scale. The altered scale is also known as the Pomeroy scale after Herb Pomeroy, the Ravel scale after Maurice Ravel, and the diminished whole tone scale due to its resemblance to the lower part of the diminished scale and the upper part of the whole tone scale.

The super-Locrian scale (enharmonically identical to the altered scale) is obtained by flattening the fourth note of the diatonic Locrian mode:

Another way to obtain the altered scale is by raising the tonic of a major scale by a half step. For example taking the tonic of the B-major scale, and raising the tonic by a half step produces the scale C–C–D–E–F–G–A–C.

The altered scale can also be the major scale with all of the notes except the tonic being flattened.

See also
Altered chord
Jazz scale

References

Sources

Further reading
 Callender, Clifton. 1998. "Voice-leading parsimony in the music of Alexander Scriabin", Journal of Music Theory 42, no. 2 ("Neo-Riemannian Theory", Autumn): 219–233.
 Tymoczko, Dmitri. 1997. "The Consecutive-Semitone Constraint on Scalar Structure: A Link Between Impressionism and Jazz." Integral 11:135–79.
 Tymoczko, Dmitri. 2004. "Scale Networks in Debussy." Journal of Music Theory 48, no. 2 (Autumn): 215–292.

External links
 "The Altered Scale for Jazz Guitar", jazzguitar.be

Heptatonic scales
Musical terminology
Jazz terminology
Hemitonic scales
Tritonic scales